To'omata Aki Tuipea is a Samoan politician and former member of the Legislative Assembly of Samoa. He is a member of the Human Rights Protection Party.

To'mata is an accountant and businessman. He has worked as an auditor for the Samoan and new Zealand governments and manages the Agriculture Store Corporation. He was first elected to the Legislative Assembly at the 2016 Samoan general election. He lost his seat at the 2021 election.

References

Living people
Members of the Legislative Assembly of Samoa
New Zealand public servants
Samoan civil servants
Human Rights Protection Party politicians
Year of birth missing (living people)